Gilbert Guillaume Marie-Jean Aubry (born 10 May 1942 in Saint-Louis, Réunion) is the Réunionnais bishop of the Roman Catholic Diocese of Saint-Denis-de-La Réunion, as well as a poet and a singer. Aubry has served as the bishop of the diocese, which is based in the city of Saint-Denis, Réunion, since his episcopal consecration on May 2, 1976.

A native of Réunion, Aubry was ordained as a Catholic priest on August 23, 1970. He was appointed the bishop of the Roman Catholic diocese of Saint-Denis-de-La Réunion just five years later, on November 20, 1975. His consecration as bishop took place on May 2, 1976, when he was just 34 years old.

Books 

 Rivages d'alizé, published en 1971, enhanced in 1975, re-released en 1980, UDIR.
 Sois peuple - Mystique marronnage, 1982, UDIR.
 Pour Dieu et pour l'Homme... Réunionnais, published in 1988, Océan Éditions.
 Poétique Mascarine, 1989, Éditions caribéennes.
 Cœur brûlant, 2000, Éditions Azalées.
 Lumière sur Rivière Noire, 2010, Éditions Azalées.

Discography 

 Créolie : une âme pour mon île, Auvidis, 1979.

See also
Roman Catholicism in Réunion

References

1942 births
Living people
People from Saint-Louis, Réunion
Roman Catholic bishops from Réunion
Bishops appointed by Pope Paul VI
20th-century French Roman Catholic bishops
21st-century French Roman Catholic bishops

Réunionnais singers
Roman Catholic bishops of Port Victoria